Bonemerse is a comune (municipality) in the Province of Cremona in the Italian region Lombardy, located about  southeast of Milan and about  southeast of Cremona.

Bonemerse borders the following municipalities: Cremona, Malagnino, Pieve d'Olmi, Stagno Lombardo.

References

Cities and towns in Lombardy